Valje is a bimunicipal locality divided by Bromölla Municipality, Skåne County and Sölvesborg Municipality, Blekinge County in Sweden. It had 823 inhabitants in 2010. The small river Sissebäck makes up the border between the municipalities. The greater part is in Scania, with about 10% of the population in Blekinge.

References 

Populated places in Bromölla Municipality
Populated places in Sölvesborg Municipality
Populated places in Skåne County